Sanchi was the final name of a 2008-built Panamanian-flagged Suezmax crude oil tanker that was operated by the National Iranian Tanker Company (NITC) under a variety of ship registries and names. On January 6, 2018, it collided with a cargo ship, CF Crystal in the East China Sea and caught fire with 32 deaths or missing and 130,000 tons of condensate oil spill. After drifting for eight days and several explosions Sanchi sank, causing extensive pollution.

Description
With a deadweight tonnage of 164,154 tons, the vessel was a typical Suezmax tanker, a vessel able to transit the Suez Canal in a laden condition.

History
The ship was built in 2008 by Hyundai Samho Heavy Industries at Yeongam, South Korea, for the National Iranian Tanker Company. It was named Saman but was renamed Sepid one month after delivery. In June 2012, it was renamed Gardenia and reflagged from Malta to Tuvalu. In November 2012, the name was changed to Seahorse and in August 2013, to Sanchi. The vessel was reflagged to Tanzania in April 2014 and to Panama in July 2016.

2018 collision

On January 6, 2018, Sanchi collided with the cargo ship CF Crystal and caught fire. Sanchi was travelling from Asaluyeh, Iran, to Daesan, South Korea. It was carrying natural-gas condensate (136,000 tonnes (960,000 barrels)) for South Korean petrochemical company Hanwha Total.

The fire burned for several days and part of the tanker exploded on January 10. After further explosions, Sanchi sank on January 14, 2018. The entire crew of 32 died, with one body recovered from the sea and two from an onboard lifeboat.

References

External links
 32 Sailors Missing After Ships Collide off China's East Coast

2008 ships
Shipwrecks of China
Oil tankers
Merchant ships of Tuvalu
Merchant ships of Tanzania
Merchant ships of Iran
Tankers of Panama
Tankers of Malta
Ships built by Hyundai Heavy Industries Group
Ships lost with all hands
Shipwrecks in the East China Sea
Maritime incidents in 2018